The 2021–22 Junior ABA League is the fifth season of the Junior ABA League with twelve men's under-19 teams from Bosnia and Herzegovina, Croatia, Montenegro, Serbia, and Slovenia. Teams were youth system rosters of the 2021–22 ABA League First Division teams.

Mega Mozzart U19 won its third Junior ABA League title defeating SC Derby U19 in the final. Forward Andrija Grbović was named the Junior ABA League MVP award.

Teams

Team allocation

Locations and personnel

Group stage

Group A 
Venue: Bar, Montenegro

Group B 
Venue: Laktaši, Bosnia and Herzegovina

Final Four

Bracket 
Venue: Ljubljana, Slovenia

Source: Junior Adriatic League

Semifinals

Mega Mozzart v Igokea m:tel

SC Derby v Cedevita Olimpija

Third place

Final

Awards

References

External links 
 Official website

U19 ABA League Championship
2021–22 in European basketball leagues
2021–22 in Bosnia and Herzegovina basketball
2021–22 in Croatian basketball
2021–22 in Montenegrin basketball
2021–22 in Serbian basketball
2021–22 in Slovenian basketball